Hubert-Jan Henket (born 11 March 1940, in Heerlen) is a Dutch architect. He is a specialist in the relations between old and new buildings, the redesign of buildings, renovation and restoration.  He is the founder of DOCOMOMO international.

Life 
Henket graduated in 1969 cum laude in architecture from the Technische Hogeschool Delft (Delft University of Technology) where he was taught by Jaap Bakema and Aldo van Eyck. In 1969-1970 he was given a grant by the Finnish government to study urbanism at the Otaniemi university of Helsinki, Teknillinen korkeakoulu. He worked with the Finnish architect Reima Pietilä. Between 1970 and 1974 he worked for Castle Park Dean Hook architects in London. Acting for this company, he was director of the Housing Renewal Unit in London from 1974 until 1976. In 1976 Henket started his own architectural practice in the Netherlands " Hubert-Jan Henket architecten". When he handed over the directorship of the office to Janneke Bierman in 2005, the name was changed to "Henket and partners architects" and in 2010 to "Bierman Henket architects". Since them, the practice has facilitated his architectural activities.

When he started working in London, Henket began teaching at The Bartlett School of Architecture of University College London. In 1976 he became "wetenschappelijk hoofdmedewerker" (scientific staff member) in renovation technique at the Technische Hogeschool Delft. From 1984 to 1998 he was professor in building technology at the Technische Universiteit Eindhoven (Eindhoven University of Technology), and from 1998 until in 2005 he held one of the chairs in architecture at Delft University of Technology.

In 1988 Henket and Wessel de Jonge founded Docomomo International, the working party for the documentation and conservation of buildings, neighborhoods and landscapes of the Modern Movement. The organization has 73 chapters worldwide. Henket is the honorary president of the organization. In 1999 the Dutch Broadcasting Corporation showed the documentary Hubert-Jan Henket, man van staal, hout en glas (Hubert-Jan Henket, man of steel, wood and glass) in the documentary series "Het Uur van de Wolf".

Work 

New buildings designed by Henket are amongst others the headquarters of the White Fathers Missionary in Dar es Salaam Tanzania, the law court buildings in Middelburg and Haarlem, the government building Ceramique in Maastricht, the wintergarden of the Hortus Botanicus in Leiden, the underground building for the faculties of theatre and dance of the ARTEZ academy in Arnhem, the Maastheatre in Rotterdam, a house near Graaff Reinet in the Great Karoo South Africa, a house near Batumi in Georgia, a house in Aerdenhout and the Dutch Embassy in Bangkok Thailand (together with Janneke Bierman).

Examples of building extensions and adaptive reuse designed by Henket are the Teylers Museum in Haarlem, the van Beuningen-de Vriese Pavilion of Museum Boymans van Beuningen in Rotterdam, het Brabants Museum and het Stedelijk Museum s'Hertogenbosch (together with Janneke Bierman), Museum de Fundatie in Zwolle, Museum het Catharijne Convent in Utrecht, the cultural centre de Verkade fabriek in s'Hertogenbosch and the royal palace Huis ten Bosch in the Hague.

Examples of restorations of 20th century buildings are Zonnestraal sanatorium (1928-1931) by Jan Duiker and Bernard Bijvoet in Hilversum (together with Wessel de Jonge) and the Academy of fine arts (1956) by Gerrit Rietveld in Arnhem. He was the supervising architect for the restoration of the Beurs van Berlage in Amsterdam, consultant for the restoration of the College Neerlandais (1931) by Willem Marinus Dudok in Paris and for the Centennial Hall (1911-1913) by Max Berg in Wroclaw Poland.

He was invited and participated in the limited competitions for the Nederlands Architectuur Instituut (NAi) in Rotterdam (1988), het Rijksmuseum (2004), the Stedelijk Museum (2005) and the Hermitage(2005) all in Amsterdam.

From 1996 till 2008 he was the supervisor of architecture of Amsterdam Airport Schiphol, he is a member of the supervising teams of among others het Hart van Zuid in Hengelo, de Spoorzone in Tilburg, and the Afsluitdijk.

Recognition 
In 1999 Henket won the Prins Bernhard Cultuurfonds) Prize for his oeuvre. In 2003 he was appointed a Knight in the Orde van de Nederlandse Leeuw (Order of the Dutch Lion). In 2004 he and Wessel de Jonge won" the BNA Kubus" of the Dutch Federation of Architects because of their contribution to the re-vitalization of architectioral heritage. Henket also won the "Victor de Steurs prijs", the "Scheudersprijs" for subterranean building and the "Bouwprijs" 2005. In 2007 the Fries Museum in Leeuwarden and the "Glaspaleis" in Heerlen honoured him with an exhibition of his work. In 2013 together with Wessel de Jonge he received the World Monuments Fund Knoll Prize for Modernism. In 2015 he was made an Honorary Fellow of the RIAI.

Publications
Bouwen is dienstverlenen: op zoek naar geschikte technologie; ontwerpen is balanceren, H.A.J. Henket (1986); inaugural speech TU Eindhoven
Bouwtechnisch onderzoek 'Jongere bouwkunst'''; Deel 1: Methode restauratiekeuze, H.A.J. Henket, W. de Jonge, joint publication of TU Delft and TU Eindhoven (1987); commissioned by Rijksdienst voor de MonumentenzorgBouwtechnisch onderzoek 'Jongere bouwkunst'; Deel 2: Demonstratie Dresselhuys paviljoen, gezamenlijke uitgave van de TU Delft en de TU Eindhoven (1987), commissioned by Rijksdienst voor de MonumentenzorgConference proceedings: first international conference, September 12–15, 1990, H.A.J. Henket; Wessel de Jonge, joint publication of Technische Universiteit Eindhoven and Rijksdienst voor Archeologie, Cultuurlandschap en Monumenten (1991), Takamasa Kuniyasu: return to the self, H.A.J. Henket, Paul Panhuysen, Lucas van Beeck, Het Apollohuis (1992); Back from Utopia: the challenge of the Modern Movement, H.A.J. Henket, Hilde Heynen; 010 Publishers (2002); Het Nieuwe Bouwen en restaureren: het bepalen van de gevolgen van restauratiemogelijkheden: onderzoek, H.A.J. Henket, W. de Jonge, joint publication of Rijksdienst voor de Monumentenzorg en SDU (1990); 
 "Waar Nieuw en Oud Raken, een pleidooi voor houdbare moderniteit in architectuur", Hubert-Jan Henket, Uitgeverij Lexturis.nl (2013) 

BibliographyHet Corps ALS Koninkrijk: 150 Jaar Delftsch Studenten Corps'', Emile Henssen, Uitgeverij Verloren (1998); 
Curriculum vitae Hubert-Jan Henket, online version here

ABT en Hubert-Jan Henket winnaars Schreudersprijs 2003" 
here ‘Architectuur is gebruikskunst ’, Het Architectenboek; online version
 "Een architect moet zich wegcijferen"; Hubert-Jan Henket, winnaar BNA-kubus, vindt dat architectuur zijn sociale functie is kwijtgeraakt. 'Een gebouw moet eigentijds zijn, niet modieus', Ludo Diels, In: de Volkskrant, 12 November 2004
"Een joviale dienaar, Prof.ir. Hubert-Jan Henket (1940) neemt afscheid als hoogleraar restauratie bij Bouwkunde. De 'dienende' ontwerper maakte de weg vrij voor een nieuwe blik op restaureren."; Robert Vischer; In: TUDelta, jaargang 37, 10-11-2005; online version
"Masterplan van Hubert-Jan Henket", Teylers Museum
here Tentoonstelling Henket & partners architecten en documentaire "De man van glas, staal en hout, Hubert-Jan Henket" in Glaspaleis Heerlen tijdens architectuurweken Heerlen, online version

Nieuw Leven, SHNI Nieuwsbrief 10 - februari 2005 – Verslag

References

External links
Bierman Henket architecten
Docomomo international

1940 births
Living people
Dutch architects
Leiden University alumni
Delft University of Technology alumni
People from Heerlen
20th-century Dutch people